Ülker Pamir (born 7 June 1913, date of death unknown) was a Turkish alpine skier. He competed in the men's combined event at the 1936 Winter Olympics. Participated in the Olympic Games in Garmisch-Partenkirchen (1936). He competed in the only event of this competition - the combined. After the downhill he was ranked 58th, out of the classified alpinists he was only ahead of his two compatriots - Karman and Erceş.

References

1913 births
Year of death missing
Turkish male alpine skiers
Olympic alpine skiers of Turkey
Alpine skiers at the 1936 Winter Olympics
Place of birth missing
20th-century Turkish people